"Clap Yo' Hands" is a song composed by George Gershwin, with lyrics by Ira Gershwin.

It was introduced in the musical Oh, Kay! (1926), and was featured by Fred Astaire and Kay Thompson in a song and dance routine in Funny Face (1957).

Notable recordings 
Roger Wolfe Kahn and his Orchestra - (1927) (charted in the U.S. at no. 9).
Whispering Jack Smith - Victor 20372-B; Matrix BVE-36992 (rec. Dec 2, 1926). This also reached the charts of the day.

References

Songs with music by George Gershwin
Songs with lyrics by Ira Gershwin
Fred Astaire songs
Liza Minnelli songs
1926 songs